Thayaga Marumalarchi Kazhagam was a political party in the Indian state of Tamil Nadu launched by Tamil film maker T. Rajendar in 1991. The party was formed as a split from Dravida Munnetra Kazhagam (DMK). The party contested in 11 seats in the 1991 Tamil Nadu Assembly elections and won in 2 of them.

In 1995, after Vaiko's departure from the DMK and the formation of Marumalarchi Dravida Munnetra Kazhagam, Rajendar's TMK merged with the DMK. Rajendar left the DMK again in 2004, to form the All India Latchiya Dravida Munnetra Kazhagam.

References

Dravidian political parties
Defunct political parties in Tamil Nadu
1991 establishments in Tamil Nadu
Political parties established in 1991
Political parties disestablished in 1996